On October 22, 2022, Hu Jintao, former General Secretary of the Chinese Communist Party, was escorted out of the hall at the closing ceremony of the 20th National Congress of the Chinese Communist Party. He was pulled from his seat by two men following the incumbent General Secretary Xi Jinping's instructions. As the media from all over the world had entered the venue at the time of the incident, the incident quickly became the focus of international coverage.

Process
In the middle of the closing meeting (after the three personnel votes ended and the media entered the venue), according to the photos taken by reporters from ABC and the videos taken by reporters from Channel News Asia, Hu Jintao, a member of the Standing Committee of the Presidium of the 20th National Congress of the Chinese Communist Party, was to check the documents on his table. For unknown reasons, Li Zhanshu and Wang Huning, allies of incumbent Party General Secretary, blocked the documents beside the red ballot folder, and then took the documents away from Hu.

According to the lip-language analysis of an anonymous Taiwanese political expert, Li said to Hu: "Don't look at it, it's all decided". This also attracted the attention of Xi Jinping, who was next to Hu. After Xi signaled, according to the scene footage taken by reporters from The Straits Times, Agence France-Presse, Associated Press, and other media, Xi's personal secretary Kong Shaoxun (Chinese: 孔绍逊), a representative of the 20th National Congress (from a constituency named "CPC central committee and state organs"), and Xi's personal bodyguards came one after another, intending to take Hu away. Hu appeared unwilling to leave.

The two sides were deadlocked for about a minute and a half. During this period, Hu repeatedly tried to get the ballot folder and documents back but failed. He also tried to open the document beside Xi but it was held down by Xi himself. Hu was pulled up by the staff, and before he left his seat, the documents were also handed over to the bodyguards to take away. Finally, Hu capitulated. Before leaving, he said a few words to Xi. Xi responded briefly. At the same time, Hu patted Li Keqiang, the Premier of China and a key figure of Hu's faction Tuanpai, who was sitting on Xi's right. No Politburo members at the front row visibly reacted to Hu's removal.

About half an hour later, Kong Shaoxun returned to Xi and left after a brief conversation. The content of Hu's conversation with Xi and his ultimate whereabouts are unclear.

The incident occurred before the congressional voting on the report of the 19th Central Committee, the work report of the 19th Central Commission for Discipline Inspection, and an amendment to the CCP constitution. Hu was absent from the voting due to this incident. Subsequent official voting results showed that all proposals passed unanimously with no abstentions or negative votes. The 20th Central Committee was also elected on the same day. Xi Jinping and Wang Huning were among the members of the new Central Committee while Li Keqiang, Li Zhanshu, and Wang Yang were not.

Media coverage

World
Afterward, many international media reported and commented on the event. CNN reported that Hu left reluctantly.The New York Times wrote that, as with many other things in Chinese politics, the truth may never be revealed. Foreign Policy wrote: "Around 2013, China watchers began to joke about the 'golden age of liberalism under Hu Jintao'. At the time, it seemed absurd that an era so politically conservative, even as civil society slowly and falteringly advanced, could be considered in that way. Over the next decade, it became far less of a joke."

Kenji Minamura (Japanese: 峯村健司), a longtime Asahi Shimbun journalist, published a series of articles on the matter in Yūkan Fuji Magazine (Japanese: 夕刊フジ) of Sankei Shimbun. One of them, on November 4, quoted an anonymous U.S. government official saying that on the morning of that day, Hu was informed that the number of Politburo members had been reduced from 25 to 24, and the one who had been reduced was Vice-premier Hu Chunhua, a protege of Hu Jintao.

The Economist said that while it is possible the act was deliberate, it was more likely that Hu was not feeling well, saying that the event "looked consistent with a sudden episode of mental confusion". Jude Blanchette, an expert at the Center for Strategic and International Studies, said that the event "didn't have the stage-managed feel of an orchestrated purge", while Bill Bishop, a China expert, noted that the China Central Television would likely not show Hu during the news footage of the event if he was purged. Chris Buckley, writing for The New York Times, said that Hu being ill was more likely than theories of him protesting against Xi.

James Palmer, a deputy editor at Foreign Policy, interpreted the incident to have been political, suggesting that it could have been Xi's intention to "deliberately and publicly humiliate his predecessor." Xi had been harshly critical in his previous speeches, speaking of "the problem that the party's leadership had been weakened, blurred, diluted, and marginalized" before his leadership. Xi said in his report:

China state media
Xinhua News Agency, China's official press agency, wrote in English on Twitter: "When [Hu] was not feeling well during the session, his staff, for his health, accompanied him to a room next to the meeting venue for a rest. Now, he is much better."

The incident was not broadcast in China and both Hu's name and that of his son, politician Hu Haifeng, were blocked online by Chinese censors.

Aftermath
Hu appeared in public alongside Xi on 5 December 2022, attending the state funeral for Jiang Zemin before his body was cremated in Babaoshan Revolutionary Cemetery. During the farewell ceremony, Hu was accompanied by an aide.

See also
 History of the People's Republic of China (2002–present)
 Beijing Sitong Bridge protest
 Hu Jintao faction
 Xi Jinping faction

References

20th National Congress of the Chinese Communist Party
October 2022 events in China
Internet censorship in China
Hu Jintao
Xi Jinping